"Brick clamp" also refers to a device (usually powered) to lift quantities of bricks.

A brick clamp is a traditional method of baking bricks, done by stacking unbaked bricks with fuel under or among them, then igniting the fuel. The clamp is considered a type of kiln.  If the clamp is insulated by packing earth or mud around it, it becomes a scove kiln.

See also
 Charcoal clamp
 Storage clamp

References

External links
Brick clamps

Clamp
Construction
Kilns
Firing techniques